Bella Sara is a life-simulation puzzle video game released for Nintendo DS and Microsoft Windows in North America and the PAL region in October 2008. The game is based on the trading card and website for girls Bella Sara. It will immerse the player in a world filled with fantasy horses, with the ability to ride, care for, accessorize and trade those horses with friends over Wi-Fi. In addition, players will be able to discover secret items, exclusive cards and codes to activate on the official website.

Reception
Jack DeVries of IGN gave Bella Sara a score of 6.5/10, saying that the game is good for enthusiasts of the card trading game but more likely to get everyone else playing it "bored in a week".

References

External links
 GameSpot Summary

2008 video games
Horse-related video games
Nintendo DS games
Video games developed in the United States
Windows games
Codemasters games
Life simulation games
Puzzle video games